The 1960 Arkansas State Indians football team represented Arkansas State College—now known as Arkansas State University—as an independent during the 1960 NCAA College Division football season. Led by first-year head coach King Block, the Indians compiled a record of 4–5.

Schedule

References

Arkansas State
Arkansas State Red Wolves football seasons
Arkansas State Indians football